Balnamona or Charlestown is a townland in the civil parish of Mullingar in County Westmeath, Ireland.

It is located in the west of Mullingar town, the R392 regional road borders the area to the north, and the Royal Canal flows through the centre of the townland. As of the 2011 census it had a population of 7 people.

References 

Townlands of County Westmeath